The 1959–60 California Golden Bears men's basketball team represented the University of California, Berkeley in NCAA University Division basketball competition. Led by sixth-year head coach Pete Newell, serving in his final season at the school, the Golden Bears made their second consecutive, and most recent, Final Four. Cal finished as runner-up in the 1960 NCAA Tournament, losing to Ohio State in the championship game.

Roster

Schedule and results

|-
!colspan=9 style=| Regular season

|-
!colspan=9 style=| NCAA Tournament

Rankings

Awards and honors
Darrall Imhoff – Consensus First-team All-American
Pete Newell – Henry Iba Award, NABC Coach of the Year, UPI College Basketball Coach of the Year

1960 NBA Draft

References

California
California Golden Bears men's basketball seasons
NCAA Division I men's basketball tournament Final Four seasons
California
California Golden Bears Basketball
California Golden Bears Basketball